This noble family traces its origins to the territorial County of Gniezno in the Voivodeship of Greater Poland. There in the administrative district of Gmina Witkowo is the village of Chłądowo. In 1692 Chłądowo (at the time called Chłędowo) was owned by the Chłędowski family. This branch of the family belongs to the Gryf Clan.  

Seweryn Chłędowski, a prominent member of the family purchased  the estates of Wietrzno in the Kingdom of Galicia and Lodomeria in 1810. From this branch Freiherr Adam von Chłędowski of the Bończa Clan married Ida Pfaff von Pfaffenhofen, the adopted daughter of Count Franz Simon Pfaff von Pfaffenhofen (1753–1840). From this marriage issued 2 sons Ludwig and Casimir, who received from Emperor Francis Joseph I the hereditary title of Baron and the right to use the name Chłędowski von Pfaffenhofen.

References
 Juliusz Ostrowski, Księga herbowa rodów polskich. Warszawa 1897. http://herbyszlachty.pl/herby_nazwiska.php?lang=pl&herb=Chledowski
 Siebmacher's Galizien p. 108
 Tadeusz Gajl, Herby szlacheckie Rzeczpospolitej Obojga Narodów. Gdańsk 2003.
 Wiktoria Wittyga oraz Stanisława Dziadulewicza. Nieznana szlachta polska i jej herby. 1908.
 Leksykon Genealogiczny - Dynamiczny Herbarz Rodzin polskich. Gryf - definicja w leksykonie genealogicznym.http://www.genealogia.okiem.pl/glossary/glossary.php?word=gryf
 C.A. Starke Verlag, Starke Genealogy Index of German Nobility. Limburg Germany. http://www.rootsweb.ancestry.com/~autwgw/sgi/sgix.htm

Coats of arms of families of Poland
Coats of arms with unicorns
Coats of arms with crowns
Coats of arms with books